Salazar is a locality in the municipality of Villarcayo de Merindad de Castilla la Vieja, in the comarca of Las Merindades, in the province of Burgos, in the autonomous community of Castile and León, Spain.

References

Populated places in the Province of Burgos